Certified Property Manager (CPM) is a real estate professional designation awarded by the Institute of Real Estate Management (IREM) and recognized by the National Association of Realtors (NAR).
 
The Institute offers a comprehensive program developed exclusively for property and asset managers working with different size portfolios of all property types. The designation is considered to be among the industry's premier real estate management credentials. There are over 8,600 professional real estate managers who hold this designation worldwide. CPM members manage approximately $900 billion in real estate assets.

To attain the CPM designation, the candidate must join IREM, which costs about $500 a year, and join the local IREM chapter for the city in which the candidate lives. There is also a fee to become a CPM candidate.

To achieve the CPM designation, a candidate must pass about 10 required courses given by IREM, including marketing, human resources, asset management and ethics and complete a management plan on a subject building and pass a 150 question exam covering all the courses.  Most courses can be taken in a classroom setting, on-line or via home study.  IREM also examines the candidate's experience.

See also
Real estate professional designations

References

External links
 Institute of Real Estate Management

Property management
Professional titles and certifications